Kuokkel mining field (Swedish:Kuokelgruvan) is an abandoned open pit mine in the vicinity of Kopparåsen railway station on the Iron Ore Line in Kiruna municipality, Norrbotten County, Sweden. The mine field was once used to mine Chalcocite (Cu2S), Bornite (Cu5FeS4), and Sphalerite ((Zn, Fe)S).

History
On the information plate found on the path to the mine field, the following information is given:

The above-mentioned accident has hit the brothers named "Jansson" in one of the mines which seems to have led to their death.

Gallery

References 

Norrbotten County
Former mines in Sweden